Las Nieves (Spanish for the Snows, and sometimes taken from María de las Nieves or Nuestra Señora de las Nieves referring to Mary, mother of Jesus) may mean:

Las Nieves, Galicia - (As Neves in Galician) in Spain
Las Nieves, Agusan del Norte - in the Philippines
Las Nieves, Durango -  in Mexico
Nevis - a Caribbean island, has a similar etymology.